Thamsanqa (Thami) Mnyele (10 December 1948 – 14 June 1985) was a South African artist associated with the anti-apartheid politics of the African National Congress and the Black Consciousness Movement.  His artistic career took off in the 1970s when he produced works dealing with the emotional and human consequences of oppression.  By the 1980s, his work followed the trajectory of the movement resisting apartheid, celebrating African strength and unity against the oppressors.

Mnyele was born in Alexandra, in Johannesburg.  His father was a minister in the African Methodist Episcopal Church, and his mother was a domestic worker.  He was sent away from the crime-ridden township to a boarding school in a village northwest of Pretoria when he was eight. When he was eight years old, his mother took him to stay with his father who then remarried Lemakatso Dorothy Mnyele. A skill which he maintained throughout his schooling and led to his hiring as a graphic artist by the J. Walter Thompson advertising agency.  In 1973, he spent several months studying at the Swedish Lutheran art center, Rorke's Drift in Natal.  He met many other young men who were inspired by the ideas of the Black Consciousness Movement, and he was inspired by their fight for equality and racial pride.

In 1979, he moved to Gaborone, the capital of Botswana, where he joined the art troupe, Medu Art Ensemble, with his friend, poet Wally Serote.  Beyond art, the ensemble published newsletters and held a famous conference in 1982 entitled "Culture and Resistance."  While in Botswana, he joined the ANC and studied guerrilla tactics at an ANC camp in Caxito, Angola.  In June 1985, the exiles knew that South African forces were approaching, but Mnyele did not leave early enough.  In the morning of 14 June, he was killed by South African commandos.

References
Diana Wylie, "From the bottom of our hearts: making art in a time of struggle" African Arts,  Winter, 2004
 Lindise Dorothy Mnyele (sister)

External links
 Biography at South African History Online

1948 births
1985 deaths
South African artists
People from Johannesburg
Assassinated South African people
South African people murdered abroad
People murdered in Botswana
Members of the African National Congress
South African exiles
South African expatriates in Botswana
1980s murders in Botswana
1985 crimes in Botswana
1985 murders in Africa